State Route 488 (SR 488) is an east–west state highway in White Pine County, Nevada. The route covers Lehman Caves Road connecting the town of Baker to Great Basin National Park. The route existed as State Route 74 prior to 1976. SR 488 has been designated a Nevada Scenic Byway.

Route description

From there, the route travels easterly through desert terrain, roughly paralleling the course of Lehman Creek as it travels down towards the town of Baker. The highway ends at an intersection with Baker Road (SR 487) in Baker.

History
An unimproved road connecting Lehman Caves to the state highway system first appears on official Nevada state highway maps as far back as 1937, although this road traveled more northeasterly than the current alignment of Lehman Caves Road and connected to Baker Road north of the town. This early iteration of State Route 74 was shown on some maps. However, the state's tourist maps did not show the existence of State Route 74 until 1942—by then, the highway route had been changed to its present-day alignment, meeting then-SR 73 at Baker. The new route was upgraded to a gravel road by 1948, and was fully paved by 1949.

SR 74 was eliminated from the state highway system as part of a mass renumbering of Nevada's state routes. State Route 488 was designated to replace SR 74 on July 1, 1976. This change in highway numbers was first seen on the 1978–79 edition of the state highway map. Since its re-designation as SR 488, Lehman Caves Road has not undergone any significant changes.

The Nevada Department of Transportation designated State Route 488 as a Nevada Scenic Byway on March 27, 2000, simultaneously with SR 487 and a nearby portion of U.S. Routes 6 and 50.

Major intersections

See also

References

External links

 Photos of State Route 488 (Nevada DOT)

488
488
Transportation in White Pine County, Nevada